My Dream may refer to:

My Dream (album), an album by Yvette Michele
"My Dream", a 1957 single by The Platters
My Dream (Thea Garrett song), a song by Thea Garrett, representing Malta, at the Eurovision Song Contest 2010
My Dream (Thomas song), a song by Thomas Ring Peterson, his winning song in the 2010 Danish series of X Factor
"My Dream", a 2015 song by Sara Groves from the album Floodplain

See also
Mi Sueño (disambiguation)